Stephanie Alfonso of Castile (1139/1148 – 1 July 1180) was an illegitimate daughter of Alfonso VII of León and Castile and Urraca Fernández de Castro, widow of Count Rodrigo Martínez. Her murder by her husband, Fernando Rodríguez de Castro, earned her the sobriquet Stephanie the Unfortunate (Estefanía la Desdichada).

Birth
Stephanie's date of birth must have occurred between 1139, when the relationship between Alfonso and her mother began, and 1148, the  year in which Alfonso confers privileges in favor of Urraca and his daughter.

Marriage
In 1157, Stephanie's father died while returning from an expedition and his kingdoms were partitioned between her legitimate half-brothers, Sancho III of Castile and Fernando II of León. Stephanie would marry Fernando Rodríguez de Castro, head of the House of Castro. Nicknamed "the Lion" in his native Castile, he was exiled as a consequence of his family's struggles with the Lara family and joined the service of Ferdinand II in León, where he was dubbed "the Castilian". Ferdinand would name him governor, at different times, of Cuéllar, Dueñas, Valladolid, Toro and Asturias, and he eventually became Ferdidand's mayordomo mayor. He had divorced his first wife, Constanza Osorio, daughter of Count Osorio Martinez, who was killed fighting Castro at the Battle of Lobregal in 1160. For his services, King Ferdinand rewarded him with Stephanie's hand, also granting them the infantazgo of León. She bore her husband a son, Pedro Fernández de Castro.

Don Fernando Ruiz de Castro(Opening stanzas from a poem in El Drama Universal by Ramón de Campoamor, with translation.)

My wife Estefanía, who is in glory, / was of Alfonso VII a dear daughter; / after today you will know, upon listening to this story, / that there are disgraces without end in our life. // Jealous, I killed her; and if, reluctant, / I did not kill myself also that night, / it was to kill later, if it was necessary, / all who, like me, doubted her.

Death
On 1 July 1180, Stephanie was murdered by her husband, Fernando, who according to some sources listed, while others have left no record of the event, it is assumed that his wife had been unfaithful and murdered. When Fernando first heard about his wife's affair with an unknown man, he watched the lovers.   He then later stabbed the man to death.  Later, he entered the chambers of his wife and stabbed her to death. When Fernando realized what the situation had turned to, he begged for forgiveness from his brother-in-law the King. The King did not punish his brother-in-law for the murder.

Stephanie was buried in the basilica of San Isidoro de León. She left two young children.

Notes

12th-century births
1180 deaths
Murdered royalty
Illegitimate children of Spanish monarchs
Castilian House of Burgundy
Burials in the Royal Pantheon at the Basilica of San Isidoro
Year of birth uncertain
Medieval murder victims
12th-century nobility from León and Castile
12th-century Spanish women
Daughters of emperors
Daughters of kings